Leake Street (also known as the Banksy Tunnel) is a road tunnel in Lambeth, London where graffiti is tolerated despite the fact that it is against the law. The street is about 300 metres long, runs off York Road and under the platforms and tracks of Waterloo station.

The walls are decorated with graffiti, initially created during the Cans Festival organised by Banksy on 3–5 May 2008. The festival ran again on the August Bank Holiday weekend 2008.

While the Eurostar terminal was at Waterloo, the road was open for through vehicular traffic. On 14 November 2008 ownership of the road passed from Eurostar to Network Rail and through traffic was restricted to pedestrians.

Prior to the 1920s the street was known as York Street.

References

External links

 Cans Festival 08 - flickr group for the event
 Tunnel becomes Banksy art exhibit, BBC News
 Leake Street Gets a Gritting, Londonist.com
 Leake Street Arches, Leake Street Arches website
 WeAreWaterloo | It's Your Waterloo. Be part of it. – Miracle on Leake Street, alternative Christmas event 2022

 

Graffiti in England
Streets in the London Borough of Lambeth
Banksy
Works by Banksy